Ralph Sandford "Smack" Thompson (May 30, 1900 – October 31, 1981) was a college football player. He was the brother of Charlie Thompson.

College football
Thompson was an All-Southern end for Kid Woodruff's Georgia Bulldogs of the University of Georgia, captain of its 1925 team. That team defeated Auburn 34 to 0 in Columbus. Allegedly, Thompson would yell out in his sleep. On the eve of a 3–0 loss to Georgia Tech, he screamed out "Kill the SOB", referring to Doug Wycoff. Once during the game both were knocked unconscious. "He was absolutely poison" wrote Morgan Blake about Thompson, "with reckless disregard for life and limb, he plunged into the thick of every play."

References

External links

1900 births
1981 deaths
American football ends
Georgia Bulldogs football players
All-Southern college football players
Players of American football from Atlanta